The Cumberland Line (numbered T5, coloured magenta) is a commuter rail line operated by Sydney Trains in Sydney, New South Wales, Australia. It connects Schofields and Leppington stations in the western suburbs. Limited services extend from Schofields to Richmond. The line opened in 1996, following the construction of a 'Y-link' track between Harris Park and Merrylands stations. The intention of this link was to allow direct services to operate from the south west suburbs to Parramatta and Blacktown without requiring a change of trains at Granville. The line takes its name from the Cumberland Plain on which much of Western Sydney was built.

History

Upon its opening in 1996, the line had a regular half-hourly service in each direction consisting of 38 journeys per day. Subsequent timetables saw its services significantly reduced to the point of running only during weekday peak hours, and from 2005 to 2013 the line only ran in one direction at a time: two services ran in the morning peak from Campbelltown towards Blacktown and three services ran in the opposite direction in the evening. Some services operated to or from Quakers Hill or Schofields on the Richmond line, but the line's official terminus on network maps and other material remained at Blacktown.

Prior to the Y-Link's opening, passengers travelling between the Western and South lines were required to change trains at Granville. With the reduction in services to peak hours only, this travelling strategy was resumed by most commuters.

In 2006, the then-Iemma Labor Government's NSW State Plan committed to re-introduce a regular half-hourly service to the Cumberland line during 2007 "subject to detailed timetable and train planning... and fleet delivery, availability and rostering". A CityRail news release on 15 December confirmed this intention, based on the gradual introduction of the then-new OSCAR (H set) trains, which would displace outer suburban Tangara G sets; the latter trains then reassigned to suburban service. This promise was not delivered, and the Cumberland Line remained a peak-hour-only service with 4 car trains.

Daytime half-hourly services were re-introduced on 21 October 2013. Services finished in the early evening and did not operate on weekends. At this time, the line was also officially extended to Schofields, where most northbound services terminated.

As part of a major timetable change for the Sydney Trains network on 26 November 2017, Cumberland Line services were modified to no longer travel to and from Campbelltown, instead starting and terminating at Leppington. Simultaneous changes to the Airport, Inner West & South Line saw that line split into the Inner West & Leppington Line and Airport & South Line. These changes mean the section of the network between Glenfield and Macarthur is served exclusively by services operating via the East Hills railway line. The changes also saw late night and weekend services introduced on the Cumberland Line. The late night services extend to Richmond, replacing T1 services at these times. On weekends, trains operate between Schofields and Liverpool only with early morning and late night services extending to Leppington and Richmond.

Description of route
Physically, the line consists of the Richmond railway line from Schofields/Richmond to Blacktown, the Main Western Line from Blacktown station to Harris Park, the 'Y-link' as described below, the "Old Main South" between Merrylands and Cabramatta, the Main South Line between Cabramatta and Glenfield, and the South West Rail Link between Edmondson Park and Leppington.

Trains and Services
During the week, the Cumberland Line usually has 2  in each direction between Schofields and Leppington. In the peak, the services usually only run till Blacktown due to other services. On the weekend, this line holds 2  in both directions between Schofields and Liverpool. The line is usually serviced by 4-car Millenniums, though sometimes being serviced by Waratah A sets.

Y-link

The 'Y-link' was opened in 1996 as part of former Prime Minister Paul Keating's 'Building Better Cities' programme in recognition of Parramatta's place as the capital of Sydney's west. It cost $80 million to construct, and required the construction of a little over one kilometre of new track and no new stations. This track consists of the creation of a triangular junction at the junction of the 'Old Main South' and the 'Main Western Line by laying track between Merrylands and Harris Park stations. The work included a new flyover of the 'Up Old Main South' over these new tracks.

Cumberland Line stations

Patronage
The following table shows the patronage of Sydney Trains network for the year ending 30 June 2022.

References

External links 
Cumberland Line timetable Transport for NSW

Sydney Trains